Alex Bogomolov Jr. was the defending champion, but decided not to compete.

Gilles Müller won the title, defeating Denis Kudla in the final, 6–2, 6–2.

Seeds

Draw

Finals

Top half

Bottom half

References
 Main Draw
 Qualifying Draw

Jalisco Open - Singles
2014 Singles